The Pakistan–Britain Advisory Group was established on 7 January 2002, during the visit of the British Prime Minister Tony Blair to Pakistan, to provide private-sector advice on key aspects of the Pakistan–Britain trading and investment relationship.

The terms of reference of the group are as follows:
The Group should confine itself to matters, of key importance to the private sector, where it believes that one or both governments can make a difference to trade/investment facilitation and market access. 
In making recommendations it should recognize the governments’ key role in establishing an appropriate enabling environment business itself.
Recommendations should be in the form of short, well argued, focused conclusions, not in lengthy papers. All recommendations should if possible be unanimous, but if that is not possible should at least come with the support of the majority of the Group.
The Group may at any time make recommendations to reform its membership and structure, or should the circumstances so dictate to suggest that the Group be stood down. The Group will automatically be stood down if it has not met over a period of a year.

Foreign trade of the United Kingdom
Pakistan–United Kingdom relations
Foreign trade of Pakistan